James Lamar Stone (December 27, 1922 – November 9, 2012) was a United States Army officer and a recipient of America's highest military decoration—the Medal of Honor—for his actions in the Korean War. He was awarded the medal for his conspicuous leadership during a fight against overwhelming odds, for continuing to lead after being wounded, and for choosing to stay behind after ordering others to retreat, a decision which led to his capture by Chinese forces.

Military service
Stone joined the Army from Houston, Texas, in 1948, and by November 21, 1951 was serving as a first lieutenant in Company E of the 2nd Battalion, 8th Cavalry Regiment, 1st Cavalry Division. On that morning, Stone's platoon relieved another American unit that was manning a hilltop outpost above the Imjin River near Sokkogae, South Korea).

At about 9:00 pm, Chinese forces launched an artillery and mortar attack against the outpost, followed by a series of infantry assaults. Stone led his platoon's defense against the battalion-sized force. Just after midnight, a second battalion joined the Chinese assault, pitting Stone's 48-man platoon against roughly 800 enemy soldiers. Wounded three times during the battle, Stone continued to lead his men and fight, including in hand-to-hand combat. Realizing the defense was hopeless, Stone ordered those men who could still walk to leave and rejoin the rest of Company E, while he stayed behind with the badly wounded to cover their retreat. Stone eventually lost consciousness and, just before dawn on November 22, he and the six remaining men of his platoon were captured by Chinese forces.

After regaining consciousness, Stone was interrogated by the Chinese before being sent to a prison camp on the Yalu River. After 22 months of captivity, he was released in a prisoner exchange on September 3, 1953. Upon his liberation, Stone learned that he was to receive the Medal of Honor for his actions during the battle near Sokkogae.

Stone's Medal of Honor was officially approved on October 20, 1953 and presented to him a week later. At a ceremony in the White House on October 27, President Dwight Eisenhower presented Medals of Honor to Stone and six others.

Stone reached the rank of colonel and served in the Vietnam War before retiring from the Army in 1980.

Medal of Honor citation
First Lieutenant Stone's official Medal of Honor citation reads:

Death
Stone died in November 2012 in Arlington, Texas, aged 89.

See also

List of Medal of Honor recipients
List of Korean War Medal of Honor recipients

Notes

References

1922 births
2012 deaths
United States Army officers
United States Army personnel of the Korean War
Korean War recipients of the Medal of Honor
United States Army Medal of Honor recipients
American prisoners of war in the Korean War
People from Pine Bluff, Arkansas